Secaucus Junction (known as Secaucus Transfer during planning stages and signed simply as Secaucus) is a  NJ Transit Rail Operations commuter rail hub in Secaucus, New Jersey. 

The $450 million,  station opened on December 15, 2003, and was dedicated as the Frank R. Lautenberg Rail Station at Secaucus Junction. U.S. Senator Frank Lautenberg, who died in 2013, was a transit advocate who had worked to allocate federal funds for the project.

The station is on the Northeast Corridor (NEC) five miles west of New York Penn Station and five miles east of Newark Penn Station. At Secaucus, the NEC crosses above the Main Line, allowing passengers to transfer between trains to and from Hoboken Terminal. It serves trains from all lines operated by NJ Transit except the Princeton Branch and Atlantic City Line. Amtrak trains run through the station but do not stop. In March 2016, a new bus station with 14 bus berths opened; it is used for intermodal connections and was intended to add redundancy to the transportation network.

Purpose and history
NJ Transit's rail operations are split between two divisions, a legacy of their roots in separate railroads. The Hoboken Division consists of lines formerly part of the Erie Lackawanna Railway and its predecessors, while the Newark Division lines had once been part of the Pennsylvania Railroad and Central Railroad of New Jersey. The two divisions had never been previously integrated, even when Conrail ran both networks under contract to the New Jersey Department of Transportation from 1976 until handing them to NJ Transit in 1983. While the opening of the Kearny Connection and Waterfront Connection in 1996 allowed for the implementation of some interdivisional trains, including the "Midtown Direct" Service to New York Penn Station on the Hoboken Division's Morris & Essex Lines, direct transfers between the divisions were still not possible.

Secaucus Junction was built to allow passengers to transfer between trains on each division. Before the station was built, passengers on lines to Hoboken Terminal had to use PATH trains or ferries to reach New York City. Conversely, with few exceptions, commuters whose trains terminated at New York Penn Station had to transfer to PATH trains at Newark Penn Station to reach Hoboken.

The two-track Northeast Corridor embankment was expanded to three tracks for a mile on each side of the station and to four tracks through the station itself, allowing Amtrak and nonstop NJT trains to pass stopped trains. The two-track Bergen County Line was re-aligned southwestward to join the two-track Main Line to pass through the station on the four-track lower level. The construction required the bodies from the Hudson County Burial Grounds to be disinterred and moved to another cemetery.

The station was built with little public parking, as NJT believed few passenger trips would originate there. In 2005, exit 15X on the adjacent New Jersey Turnpike opened to provide easier access to the station; two years later, it was the least-used interchange on the turnpike, possibly due in part to the lack of parking at the station. On June 1, 2009, Edison Parkfast, a private company, opened the first parking lot near the station, with space for 1,094 cars. Bicycle parking is also available.

On July 26, 2009, NJ Transit began shuttle service to the Meadowlands station at the Meadowlands Sports Complex, with Secaucus Junction being a transfer point for passengers from New York Penn and other stations. From 2009 to 2014, Secaucus Junction served trains coming from Metro-North's New Haven Line for New York Giants and New York Jets football games at the Meadowlands with 1:00 p.m. kickoffs on Sundays.

On June 5, 2013, a special Amtrak train stopped at the station to carry the coffin of Lautenberg to Washington, D.C. for his burial. On February 2, 2014, a limited number of Amtrak trains made stops at Secaucus for passengers going to Super Bowl XLVIII. In March 2016, a new bus station with 14 bus berths opened; it is used for intermodal connections and was intended to add redundancy to the transportation network. Local officials have indicated a desire to have regular Amtrak service stop at Secaucus Junction after American Dream Meadowlands opened in October 2019, however, as of 2022, this has not been implemented.

Station layout

Despite its name Secaucus Junction is not a true junction, in which trains can switch between lines; there is no rail connection between the upper and lower levels. The station has two platform levels connected by a third level on top.  Such a loop, however, is proposed as part of the Gateway Project to improve commuter access to Manhattan.

 The bottom level lacks electrification and has four tracks and two island platforms serving the Bergen County Line, Main Line, Pascack Valley Line, Port Jervis Line, and Meadowlands Line trains, which originate and terminate at Hoboken Terminal.
 The upper level tracks are electrified and carry trains to and from New York Penn Station (usually the Northeast Corridor, North Jersey Coast, Montclair-Boonton, and Morristown Lines) with four tracks and three platforms: two side platforms serving Tracks 2 and 3 (where nonstop trains usually bypass) and one island platform between Tracks A and B. Amtrak trains pass through the upper-level tracks without stopping.
 The upper concourse has a food court and snack bar, and serves passengers switching trains. To transfer between trains on different levels, passengers climb up to the concourse, pass through faregates (which only accept a ticket once), and descend to their destination platforms. At the center of this level is a  steel, glass, and titanium sculpture of a cattail (abundant in the surrounding New Jersey Meadowlands) by San Francisco artist Louis "Cork" Marcheschi. The tops of the cattails are lit from within in the purple, blue, and orange colors of NJ Transit.

Proposed New York City Subway extension

An extension of that service from Times Square – 42nd Street to a new terminus at Eleventh Avenue and 34th Street, has already been built.

The extension would take the subway outside the city's and New York's borders and under the Hudson River for the first time. The plan would alleviate pressure on the NJ Transit/Amtrak route under the Hudson, after the cancellation of the Access to the Region's Core tunnel project by New Jersey Governor Chris Christie in October 2010. It would offer a direct route to Grand Central Terminal on the east side of Manhattan, while connecting with most other subway routes. New York City spent $250,000 for a consultant to conduct feasibility studies for the project. However, no design work commenced nor were financing arrangements made. On October 26, 2011, Bloomberg reiterated his support for the project, while Christie also expressed general concurrence. In April 2013, the Metropolitan Transportation Authority rejected the proposed extension, citing lack of funding. However, it was reconsidered again in 2018.

Gateway Project
The Gateway Project, a series of infrastructure improvements along the NEC between Newark Penn Station and New York Penn Station, includes a proposal to build the so-called Secaucus Loop or Bergen Loop, tracks connecting the Main Line and the NEC at Secaucus, thus creating a true junction station. As part of the second phase of the Gateway Project, the loop is projected to be constructed between 2024 and 2030.

See also
 Jamaica station – station on the nearby Long Island Rail Road that serves a similar purpose to Secaucus Junction

References

External links 
 

 Station Directory

NJ Transit Rail Operations stations
NJ Transit bus stations
Stations on the Northeast Corridor
Stations on the Main Line (NJ Transit)
New Jersey Meadowlands District
Transit hubs serving New Jersey
Secaucus, New Jersey
Railway stations in Hudson County, New Jersey
Railway stations in the United States opened in 2003
2003 establishments in New Jersey